Leon J. Lombardi (born April 16, 1949 in Brockton, Massachusetts) is an American attorney and politician who served as a member of the Massachusetts House of Representatives from 1977–1983 and as the Chairman of the Massachusetts Republican Party from 1990-1992. He was the Republican nominee for Lieutenant Governor of Massachusetts in 1982. He was appointed an associate justice of the Massachusetts Land Court Department by Gov. William Weld in 1995 and retired in 2008.

References 

1949 births
Boston University School of Law alumni
Living people
Massachusetts Republican Party chairs
Republican Party members of the Massachusetts House of Representatives
People from Brockton, Massachusetts
Tufts University alumni
People from Easton, Massachusetts